Leung Ka Yu (born 28 May 1996) is a Hong Kong road and track cyclist, who currently rides for UCI Continental team .

Major results

Road

2013
 1st  Road race, National Junior Road Championships
 4th Time trial, Asian Junior Road Championships
2014
 1st  Time trial, National Junior Road Championships
 5th Time trial, Asian Junior Road Championships
2017
 3rd Team time trial, Asian Road Championships
 3rd Time trial, National Under-23 Road Championships
2018
 5th Road race, National Road Championships
2019
 3rd Team time trial, Asian Road Championships
 National Road Championships
3rd Road race
3rd Time trial

Track

2013
 National Junior Track Championships
1st  Kilo
1st  Individual pursuit
1st  Omnium
2014
 1st  Team pursuit, National Track Championships (with Leung Chun Wing, Wu Lok Chun & Cheung King Wai)
2015
 National Track Championships
1st  Team pursuit (with Leung Chun Wing, Maximilian Gil Mitchelmore & Law Kwun Wa)
1st  Team sprint (with Leung Chun Wing & Law Kwun Wa)
2017
 1st  Scratch, National Track Championships
2018
 1st  Omnium, National Track Championships
 2nd  Team pursuit, Asian Games
2019
 3rd  Scratch, Asian Track Championships
2020
 3rd  Team pursuit, Asian Track Championships

References

External links

1996 births
Living people
Hong Kong male cyclists
Place of birth missing (living people)
Asian Games medalists in cycling
Cyclists at the 2018 Asian Games
Medalists at the 2018 Asian Games
Asian Games silver medalists for Hong Kong